Ferenc Salbert (born 5 August 1960) is a retired pole vaulter who represented France after switching from Hungary.

Biography
His indoor result of 5.90 metres in 1987 placed him second on the top performers list that year, behind Sergey Bubka. Salbert was elected vice president of the Hungarian Athletic Federation on 10 November 2002.

Achievements

See also
 French all-time top lists - Pole vault

References

1960 births
Living people
Hungarian male pole vaulters
French male pole vaulters
Naturalized citizens of France